Charles G. Osborne was an American football player and coach. He played at the tackle position for Harvard University from 1904 to 1906.  In 1906, Osborne was selected as a first-team All-American. He was a player who reportedly "enjoyed the game himself every minute he was playing" and "played football purely for the fun he got out of it."  After graduating in 1907, Osborne became an assistant coach to the Harvard football team.  In the fall of 1907, he wrote a letter to the Harvard Crimson advocating the formation of an alumni football team that would play against Harvard's varsity team each fall.  Under Osborne's proposal, the alumni players "would be enabled to keep up their football for a few weeks every fall," and they would benefit the varsity team by allowing them regularly to play "against the strongest possible kind of scrub team."

References

1880s births
All-American college football players
American football tackles
Harvard Crimson football players
Harvard Crimson football coaches
Year of death missing